Saccidananda Ashram (also called Shantivanam) is a Camaldolese Benedictine monastery in Tannirpalli, India founded in 1950.

Description 
Located in the village of Tannirpalli in the Tiruchirapalli District of Tamil Nadu, on the bank of the River Kavery, it was founded in 1950 by French priest Jules Monchanin, who was later to adopt the name Parma Arupi Anananda, and French Benedictine monk Henri le Saux, who was later to adopt the name Abhishiktananda.  Together, the two wrote a book about their ashram, entitled An Indian Benedictine Ashram  which was later re-published under the title A Benedictine Ashram.

The goal of le Saux and Monchanin was to integrate Benedictine monasticism with the model of an ashram.  They took sannyasa and wore kavis.  Trappist monk Francis Mahieu joined them in 1953, and was later to go on to found Kurisumala Ashram with Bede Griffiths in 1958.  Griffiths himself stayed at Saccidananda Ashram in 1957 and 1958, and was later to return to the monastery in 1968 as its leader.  Monchanin had died in 1957, and le Saux preferred more and more to stay in his hermitage in the Himalayas rather than at Saccidananda Ashram.

The name "Saccidananda" is the name for the Christian Holy Trinity (the nickname "Shantivanam" meaning "forest of peace").  Literally translated as "Being — Consciousness/Knowledge — Bliss" ("Sat — Cit — Ananda") the name was coined by Keshub Chandra Sen in 1882 as the name for the Trinity.  Monchanin's adopted name (Parma Arupi Anananda) similarly meant "man of the supreme joy of the Spirit" or "supreme formless joy" and le Saux's adopted name (Abhishiktananda) meant "bliss of Christ" or "he whose joy is the blessing of the Lord".

The name of the monastery was a reflection of Monchanin's attempt to blend Christian and Hindu mysticism together; but it was also a reflection of Monchanin's firm commitment to Christianity.  Monchanin, who was more of an intellectual than le Saux, did not desire to identify the Advaita concept of the Absolute with the Holy Trinity, stating that "Christian mysticism is Trinitarian or it is nothing", but he did believe that with a lot of work it was possible to reconcile the two mystical traditions, and this was the principle upon which Saccidananda Ashram was founded.  This integration of the Vedanta with Christianity is a point upon which the two founders of Saccidananda Ashram differed.  Le Saux was more radical in his thinking than Monchanin.  Whilst Monchanin held to the idea of Christianizing other religions, le Saux (who often referred to Monchanin as his "Christian Guru", although there was no clear master-disciple relationship between the twain) believed that non-Christian religions could transform Christianity itself.

References

Citations

References

Further reading

External links

 Shantivanam Ashram
 Oblates of Shantivanam
 Shantivanam at Bede Griffiths Trust

Catholic Church in India
Christianity in Tamil Nadu
Benedictine monasteries
Religious organizations established in 1938
Tiruchirappalli district